The Jamia mosque or Queen Victoria mosque is situated at the corner of Chiappini and Castle street, Cape Town. It is considered to be the first and oldest mosque in Cape Town, and the largest in the Bo-Kaap area of Cape Town.

History
While some sources mention that the mosque was built in the year 1850, others mention that the land for building the mosque was granted only in the year 1851. It is a Shafee mosque and was the first mosque built on land that was specifically given for a mosque site by the British Crown. This may have been one reason it was referred to as Queen Victoria mosque. Another reason it was referred to thus could have been the involvement of the British Crown in resolving disputes within the Muslim community. The Jamia mosque site was granted to the Cape Muslims with the expressed assurance that it be utilised by all Muslims regardless of their differences. The land grant resulted out of conditions in the Colony in 1846.

Notes

References

Mosques in Cape Town
Queen Victoria